Karl Heider (born January 21, 1935) is an American visual anthropologist.

Life and education
Heider was born in Northampton, Massachusetts. Heider is the son of psychologists Fritz and Grace (née Moore) Heider.  He had two brothers; John and Stephan.

After spending two years at Williams College, Heider transferred to Harvard College where he earned his B.A. in anthropology. Heider then spent a year touring Asia on a Sheldon Traveling Fellowship provided by Harvard. Returning to Harvard in 1958, Heider went on to earn an M.A. in 1959 and Ph.D. in 1966.

He was married to the psychologist Eleanor Rosch with whom he studied the Dani people.  The couple divorced in the late 1970s.

Career
Heider's work ranged from psychological anthropology to visual anthropology.

It has included going into the West Papua region in the 1960s and 1990s, as well as producing works on ethnographic film making and writing on Indonesian cinema.

Filmography
 Tikal (1961)
 Dani Sweet Potatoes (1974)
 Dani Houses (1974)

See also
 Visual anthropology
 Seeing Anthropology written by Karl G. Heider
 Rashomon effect

External links
 Interviewed by Alan Macfarlane 30th June 2007 (video)

Notes

1935 births
Williams College alumni
Harvard College alumni
Living people
American anthropologists